The Taurus molecular cloud (TMC-1) is an interstellar molecular cloud in the constellations Taurus and Auriga. This cloud hosts a stellar nursery containing hundreds of newly formed stars. The Taurus molecular cloud is only 140 pc (430 ly) away from Earth, making it possibly the nearest large star formation region. It has been important in star formation studies at all wavelengths.

It is notable for containing many complex molecules, such as cyanopolyynes HCnN for n = 3,5,7,9, and cumulene carbenes  for n = 3–6.

The Taurus molecular cloud was identified in the past as a part of the Gould Belt, a large structure surrounding the solar system. More recently (January 2020) the Taurus molecular cloud was identified as being part of the much larger Radcliffe wave, a wave-shaped structure in the local arm of the Milky Way.

The newly formed stars in this cloud have an age of 1–2 million years. The Taurus–Auriga association, which is the stellar association of the cloud, contains the variable star T Tauri, which is the prototype of T Tauri stars. The many young stars and the close proximity to earth make it uniquely well-suited to search for protoplanetary disks and exoplanets around stars, and to identify brown dwarfs in the association. Members of this region are suited for direct imaging of young exoplanets, which glow brightly in infrared wavelengths.

Members of the Taurus–Auriga association with a circumstellar disk or exoplanet:

HL Tauri – directly imaged disk with impressive details
SU Aurigae – circumstellar disk
AB Aurigae – circumstellar disk and hints of an exoplanet
CI Tauri – directly imaged circumstellar disk, one confirmed exoplanet and hints of additional exoplanets
V830 Tauri – circumstellar disk and one exoplanet V830 Tauri b
LkCa 15 – directly imaged circumstellar disk and one possible directly imaged exoplanet LkCa 15 b
GG Tauri – circumstellar disk
UX Tauri – circumstellar disk
DH Tauri – exoplanet DH Tauri b
DG Tauri B – circumstellar disk associated with jets
V1298 Tauri – four confirmed transiting exoplanets

See also 

 Orion molecular cloud complex
 Rho Ophiuchi cloud complex
 Perseus molecular cloud
 Cygnus X
List of nearby stellar associations and moving groups

References

Dark nebulae
Gould Belt
Molecular clouds
Taurus (constellation)
Articles containing video clips
Star-forming regions